The 1938–39 season was the 41st in the history of the Southern League. Colchester United won the title. Three clubs applied to join the Football League, although none were successful. The following season saw the league split into Eastern and Western sections as part an emergency war-time competition, after which the league was discontinued until the end of World War II.

Final table

A total of 23 teams contest the division, including 17 sides from previous season, one team relegated from The Football League and five new teams.

Team relegated from 1937–38 Football League:
 Gillingham
Newly elected teams:
 Chelmsford City
 Worcester City
 Arsenal II
 Cardiff City II
 Ipswich Town II

Football League election
Three Southern League clubs, Chelmsford City, Colchester United and Gillingham, applied to join the Football League. However, both League clubs were re-elected.

References

1938-39
4
1938–39 in Welsh football